Gramat is a commune in the Lot department in south-western France. Gramat station has rail connections to Brive-la-Gaillarde, Figeac and Rodez.

Population

See also
Communes of the Lot department

References

Communes of Lot (department)
Quercy